Little Women is a 1917 British silent historical drama film directed by Alexander Butler and starring Daisy Burrell, Mary Lincoln and Minna Grey. It was the first film adaptation of the 1868-69 two-volume American novel Little Women by Louisa May Alcott. It is now considered a lost film.

Plot summary

Cast
 Daisy Burrell as Amy March
 Mary Lincoln as Meg March
 Minna Grey as Marmie March
 Muriel Myers as Beth March
 Ruby Miller as Jo March
 Milton Rosmer as Theodore Laurence
 Wyndham Guise as Professor Friedrich Bhaer
 Roy Travers as John Brooke
 Lionel d'Aragon as Mr. Laurence
 Florence Nelson as Aunt March
 Bert Darley as Pastor March
 Molly Vaughan as Sally Moffatt
 Vivian Tremayne as Belle Moffatt
 Sylvia Cavalho as Anne Moffatt

References

Bibliography
 Low, Rachael. History of the British Film, 1914-1918. Routledge, 2005.
 Cartmell, Deborah & Whelehan, Imelda. Adaptations: From Text to Screen, Screen to Text. Routledge, 1999

External links
 

1917 films
1910s historical drama films
British black-and-white films
British historical drama films
British silent feature films
Films directed by Alexander Butler
Little Women films
Lost British films
1917 lost films
Lost drama films
1917 drama films
1910s English-language films
1910s British films
Silent historical drama films